Imran Hussain (born 7 June 1978) is a British Labour Party politician and a barrister. He became the Member of Parliament (MP) for the constituency of Bradford East after gaining the seat from the Liberal Democrats at the 2015 general election. He was re-elected to Parliament in 2017 and 2019. He is a member of the Socialist Campaign Group parliamentary caucus.

Early life
Hussain was born and raised in Bradford, West Yorkshire. He attended local state-funded schools and as a teenager worked in Morrisons supermarket, sweeping floors and stacking shelves.

Political career

Councillor
Hussain was a Labour councillor in the City of Bradford Metropolitan District Council having first been elected in 2002. In 2003, Hussain brought forward a motion to Bradford Council opposing the Iraq War.

In 2008, he was elected as Deputy Leader of the council's Labour Group. In 2010, when Labour took control of the council, he became Deputy Leader of Bradford Council and remained in that position for five years until the 2015 general election when he was elected to the House of Commons.

Following his election to Westminster, Hussain rejected his council allowance, which he was entitled to, stating it was a "principled decision" as it would be wrong "to get two salaries" from public office.

Bradford West by-election
In 2012, Hussain was selected by Labour to contest Bradford West in the by-election caused by the resignation of the Labour incumbent, Marsha Singh, due to "serious illness". George Galloway of the Respect Party chose to stand at this by-election. Shortly before polling day, a leaflet was distributed in the constituency which asserted: "God KNOWS who is a Muslim. And he KNOWS who is not." It continued: "Let me point out to all the Muslim brothers and sisters what I stand for. I, George Galloway, do not drink alcohol and never have. Ask yourself if the other candidate [Imran Hussain] in this election can say that truthfully." The leaflet contained no identifying party logo or indication of the agent or printer, as required by law. Although a connection to the Respect Party candidate was initially denied, it was later confirmed that the document had been approved by Galloway.

The election was unexpectedly won by Galloway with a large majority.

Member of Parliament
In 2014, Bradford East Constituency Labour Party opened its parliamentary selection process. In the final selection meeting held on 1 November 2014, Hussain was chosen over three other candidates, including the President of the Trades Union Congress to become Labour's candidate for the seat. During his 2015 general election campaign for Bradford East, Hussain rejected a £1,000 donation from Tony Blair citing his own opposition to the Iraq War as the reason.

He was subsequently elected to Parliament in 2015 by gaining the seat from David Ward of the Liberal Democrats with a 13.8% swing to Labour and a majority of 7,084.

On 15 May 2015, Hussain was one of 10 newly elected Labour MPs who signed an open letter calling for a Leader of the Labour Party who will not "draw back to the ‘New Labour’ creed of the past" and will oppose austerity.

On 20 July 2015, Hussain was one of 48 Labour MPs who voted against the Welfare Bill and therefore rebelled against the Labour Party's position of abstaining on the vote. He described the bill as "cruel and unfair" and said it would be "attacking hard working families, the poorest and children".

Hussain was one of 36 Labour MPs who nominated Jeremy Corbyn as a candidate in the Labour leadership election of 2015. He fully supported Corbyn's leadership campaign. On 14 January 2016, Hussain was appointed Shadow Minister of State for International Development by Jeremy Corbyn. On 3 July 2017, he was appointed Shadow Minister of State for Justice. Hussain nominated Rebecca Long-Bailey as a candidate in the Labour leadership election of 2020 and nominated Richard Burgon for the deputy leadership. On 9 April 2020 he was appointed by Keir Starmer as Shadow Minister of State for Employment Rights.

References

External links

1978 births
Living people
Labour Party (UK) MPs for English constituencies
Politicians from Bradford
UK MPs 2015–2017
UK MPs 2017–2019
UK MPs 2019–present
British politicians of Pakistani descent